Faaā (also Faaa or Faaʻā) is a commune in the suburbs of Papeete in French Polynesia, an overseas country of France in the Pacific Ocean. Faaā is located on the island of Tahiti, in the administrative subdivision of the Windward Islands, themselves part of the Society Islands. At the 2017 census Faaā had a population of 29,506, making it the most populous commune on Tahiti and in French Polynesia. Faaā has many mountains inland that can reach . Mount Marau is an extinct volcano in the inland limits and can be seen from nearby Moorea.

Faaā has a long history. Captain James Cook landed on Faaā when he came to Tahiti on his expedition. The commune is the political stronghold of independence leader Oscar Temaru who has served three times as president.

Demographics 

In 1988 Faaā succeeded Papeete as the most populated commune in the urban area of Papeete and in French Polynesia. Despite having more inhabitants than Papeete, the urban area is named after Papeete and Faaā is considered a suburb of Papeete due to Papeete's historical importance and status as administrative capital of French Polynesia. The Papeete Urban Area has a population of about 130,000.

Politics
The municipality of Faʻaʻā is administered by a 35-member municipal council, headed by a mayor assisted by 10 deputies. The council regulates the affairs of the commune through its deliberations and responds to the wishes of its population through the services of the town hall, which has five directorates headed by a general directorate.

List of mayors of Fa'a'ā 
 Francis Sanford (1965–1977)
 Alfred Helme (1977–1983)
 Oscar Temaru (1983–present)

Transportation

Air 
The airport is the only international airport in French Polynesia. Travellers from other islands must come to this airport for international flights. Some of the international flights from the airport go to Los Angeles, California; Tokyo, Japan; and Auckland, New Zealand. The airport is easily accessible from downtown Faaā. Airport shuttles and Tahiti buses come to the parking lot. There are coconut trees and a Tiki in the parking lot. Flowers from local farms are sent to the airport to be given to arriving passengers.

Freeways and roads 
Tahiti's West Coast freeway runs through the commune from Papeete to Teahupoo. There are many other roads in Faaā. The Tahiti transportation bus runs around the Papeete area. There is little road traffic in Faaā. There are bridges over the many canals and small rivers that flow through Faaā. Many of the residents of Faaā have Ford or Toyota trucks. Vehicles are available in the town center of Papeete. There are few car dealers in Faaā. Residents who have cars for sale often park on the street with a for-sale sign showing the price and a contact number. Most of the streets are paved.

Location and geography 

Faaā is located in northwestern Tahiti. There is a slight bay south of the airport where the roads and freeways move inland. Faaā is in northwestern French Polynesia. The Papenoo River is fairly close. Mount Orohena is in the mountains of Faaā. Tahiti Iti is just to the southeast of the commune. Easter Island is not too far east of Faaā. There are some viewpoints in Faaā to see Moorea. Moorea appears as a gray mound with mountains across the Pacific Ocean. The Faaā Nature Park is a major park in the mountains. New Caledonia is located not too far to the west of Faaā.

Nearby communes 
Uturoa is a closer commune on Raiatea. Papeete borders Faaā on the north and Papera borders Faaā on the south.

Climate 
Faaā lies in a tropical monsoon climate zone and thus experiences very little seasonal variation.

Cyclones have struck Faaā about 10 times, causing major damage to the neighborhoods low and flat. Houses flipped over and some flooding took place in downtown Faaā .

Education 
The University of French Polynesia is in central Faaā. Students from many other islands come to this university since it is the only one in the territory. It is a relatively small university with around 2,000 students. There are elementary, middle, and high schools located inland in the neighborhoods. Most of the schools are in separate buildings, each of them being one class. There are about five classes per grade at elementary schools. Some families have their children go to school in other countries like the United States or New Zealand. If they were to have their students go to California for education, they would usually go to the University of California, Los Angeles in Los Angeles. The main subject at the schools in Faaā is mathematics.

History of Faaā

Early settlers 
Faaā was first settled by travelers from Asia who arrived in canoes in the year 700. At that time, the settlers from Asia made small houses from grass and wood. Faaā had only 400 residents. They fished from the beach and from their canoes. The settlers made spears from the charcoal on the beach. Soon, many more settlers came from Asia, swelling the population to 700 by the year 1220. Some of the people fed on breadfruit and bananas from banana trees. The settlers kept moving inland from the beach. They looked across the ocean and saw Moorea, which had also been settled. Some of the settlers on Tahiti paddled their canoes to visit Moorea. By 1300, Faaā had about 1,000 residents. Faaā had many grass houses along the beach, many close to one another. Some of the residents left open spaces to let their kids play. Some of the early Tahitians made small fires from leaves to stay warm during winter. By the 1330s, 1,300 residents had settled in Faaā. Most of the settlers moved their houses inland as the beachfront was flooded during cyclones and high tides. The Tahitians moved into the small valleys close to Mount Orohena. Many of the early Polynesians had canoed to Moorea and back many times. They had been careful of the many stonefish in the water.

European contact 
European settlers came during the 1500s. Captain James Cook was the first European visitor. He first came to Moorea but then sailed to Tahiti. The Tahitians were all wondering who he was and why he was here. Then he left Tahiti and went exploring other islands in the Pacific Ocean. He later reached New Zealand and the eastern coast of Australia. Then Charles Darwin came on his expedition to Tahiti. During the late 1800s, Faaā had a population of 2,000 residents. Some of the residents went to California to go to the California Gold Rush to search for a new life. Faaā was part of the Kingdom of Tahiti until the annexation of 1880. Many buildings made from wood were along the coast of Faaā. Some small markets selling bananas and other fruits were busy. Residents from Moorea came to get fruits from the markets. Farms could be found in the mountains of Faaā.

Modern Faaā 
During the early 1900s, Faaā's population had grown to 5,000. Many markets had more choices and even some toys for kids. Some bigger boats were made for the new Faaā Port. The boats sailed from Faaā onward to other communes on Tahiti such as Arue and Teahupoo. Downtown Faaā was very busy and public beaches were formed on the waterfront of Faaā. There was a big field in the north of Faaā and Faaā International Airport was built here in 1962. One of the first airplanes was Air Tahiti, which first went to other islands in French Polynesia. The international airlines such as Air Tahiti Nui were incorporated in the late 1990s. Air Moorea runs several flights daily between Tahiti and Moorea. In 2007 one flight crashed into the lagoon and 20 people died. Don the Beachcomber lived here part of his life. The Moorea ferry was also created after the flight and still sails to Moorea each day. Today, Faaā has a population of nearly 30,000 inhabitants.

Dates 
700 The area of Faaā is first settled by early Polynesians
900 Faaā has many grass houses along the beach and inland
1600 Faaā's population grows to 1,500
1777 Captain James Cook is the first European to land on Tahiti
1855 Many Faaā residents leave for the California Gold Rush
1910 Faaā has more than 5,000 residents
1962 Faaā International Airport opened
1998 Air Tahiti Nui is founded
2007 Air Moorea crashes while going to Moorea

Parks and recreation 
There is one long coastal beach park with 3 playgrounds per kilometer and concrete spaces where Tahitian dancers perform. There are many more parks in the neighborhoods of Faaā. The usual park in Faaā has a playground, open grass spaces, and trees and only a few have Basketball courts. School parks have mainly open grass spaces and a few trees. There are about 170 parks in Faaā. Hiking trails can be found in the mountains of Tahiti. It is part of the Faaā Nature Park. There are viewing points viewing the Papeete Area. The harbor can also be seen with the Aremiti Ferry coming in and out of the harbor. Mape trees grow in the park. Sometimes the mape tree roots grow on the trails making them dangerous at those points. Many birds fly over the trails and some rivers run through the park. Birdwatching is very popular among the tourists. There is a visitor center near which starts the main hiking trail. Moorea can be seen across the Pacific Ocean from some of the viewing points. Souvenir shops are found in the mountain parks. Postcards are very popular for the tourist coming to Faaā. Other souvenirs at the shop include towels, small tikis, and Tahitian card games. There are also hiking trails in nearby communes of Tahiti and Moorea.

Economy 

Air Tahiti has its head office on the airport property in Faaā. There are many supermarkets in Faaā. The supermarkets mainly sell bread, milk, fruits, and ice cream. There is also one of the largest malls in French Polynesia in downtown Faaā. It has a clothing store a market, and a souvenir shop. The now defunct Air Moorea had its head office in Faaā. Many people that work in other communes such as Papeete or Teahupoo live in Faaā. There are businesses like McDonald's that are close to the public beach. The port of Papeete has many workers that live in Faaā. Many other people that work in Papeete or Teahupoo live in Faaā. McDonald's is a popular restaurant in Faaā that is close to the beach, just off Tahiti's west coast freeway. The port of Papeete has many workers who live in Faaā. There is a Carrefour market in the commune.

Agriculture 
Farms in Faaā are usually found in the mountains to the east. The farms in the mountains have Tahitian flowers growing in the fields. The flowers get picked and are usually sent to Faaā International Airport to greet the passengers that have just arrived. There are many tractors on the fields that plow the dirt. Banana trees are plentiful throughout Faaā and also a major export to other islands. The main islands that get imported from Faaā are Moorea, Huahine, and Raiatea. Many strawberries are also found in the farms. Potatoes, apples, and raspberries are all other major fruits grown at the farms of Faaā. School lunches usually contain fruits from these farms. The Moorea juice factory is a major juice factory on Moorea that exports its juice to Faaā.

Hardware 
Ace is a major hardware store in Faaā. It is made up of more than one building. There are 3 of these buildings. One of the buildings is for supplies and objects needed in houses. Another one of the 3 buildings is for Wood supplies and Wood Glue. The third building is for cement mixers and screws. Other major hardware stores are the Faaā Supply Store. It is made up of one building for mainly supplies and cement mixers and another for wood. Other hardware stores of Faaā are Polymat, Polywood, and Polybuild. Ace delivery trucks are found throughout the neighborhoods of Faaā.

Technology
Faaā is full of cell phones. Faaā has major industrial valleys far inland. These areas have hardware industries as well. Ace is close to a store a lot like Circuit City. Dishwashers and refrigerators are the main goods found inside the store.

Sports

World Championship Tour
The surfing world champions of Teahupoo have been to Faaā. Teahupoo is a reef break, making big waves. The swells usually break to the left but sometimes break to the right. The big swells cause Teahupoo to become a major place for the World Championship Tour (WCT). People such as Mike Stewart and Ben Severson are the boogieboarding champions of Teahupoo. The first surfing champion of Teahupoo to win an award was in 1999.

Other sports
Soccer games (in Faaā, it's called football) is a major sport played at the school parks. The parks have chairs set in a field and people can easily see the game. The soccer fields are relatively small.

Other major sports played in Faaā are tennis and basketball.

Name 
The official spelling of the French Commune is Faaa. However, it is more frequently spelled as Faa'a or Fa'a'a, using the apostrophe to represent the glottal stop, as promoted by the Académie Tahitienne and accepted by the territorial government.

Music of Faaā 

The nose flute (vivo) is a popular instrument throughout French Polynesia. Tahitian drums (toere) are also popular and are made from hollow trunks of trees and animal skins. The residents of Faaā can take lessons at the University of French Polynesia.

Art
There are art museums in the mountains of Faaā. The mountains of Tahiti and other islands have inspired Paul Gauguin. Some paintings can be found in the museums which are a very popular tourist attraction. The Musée de la Perle is a major art museum in nearby Papeete. The house of James Norman Hall used to be a mansion in Arue. It is now a renowned museum that is a major tourist attraction. Art galleries are found throughout the island of Tahiti and there are 10 right in Papeete.

See also 

 Demographics of France
 Demographics of French Polynesia
 Mahina, French Polynesia

References

Communes of French Polynesia
Towns and villages in Tahiti
Populated places established in the 8th century
1st-millennium establishments in Tahiti
8th-century establishments in Oceania